Becca is a 1989 UK-Australian TV movie about a Welsh farmer who is transported to Australia in the 1840s. It was shot in English and Welsh. Beth Robert and Dafydd Hywel played the main characters.

References

External links

Australian television films
1989 television films
1989 films